Kay Firth-Butterfield is a lawyer, professor, and author specializing in the intersection of artificial intelligence, international relations, and AI ethics. She is currently serving as the head of AI and machine learning at the World Economic Forum. She was an adjunct professor of law at the University of Texas at Austin.

Firth-Butterfield is the writer of two books: Human Rights and Human Trafficking and Laws on Human Trafficking, the latter co-authored with Tina Miranda. She also wrote articles and gave speeches on the topics of AI, law, international relations, AI ethics and AI for business and government transformation.

Education 
Firth-Butterfield graduated with a Bachelor of Arts in law and social science from the University of Sussex. She attended St. Mary's University for her further studies, where she received a Master's degree in international relations and a Master of Laws.

Career 
Firth-Butterfield started her career as a barrister and part-time judge in the United Kingdom. Over time, she began to research more topics about the future of law, including the impact of AI, and specialized more at the intersection of AI and policy. More recently, she has served as an adjunct professor of law at the University of Texas at Austin, where she co-founded the AI-Austin initiative with the Robert S. Strauss Center for International Security and Law. Firth-Butterfield is currently an Associate Fellow at the Leverhulme Center for the Future of Intelligence at the University of Cambridge and heads the AI and machine learning executive committee at the World Economic Forum.

She has advised governments, think tanks, and nonprofits about artificial intelligence law, ethics, and policy. She established an AI ethics advisory panel at Lucid.ai in 2014, which has since included AI experts like Murray Shanahan, Max Tegmark, and Derek Jinks. Since 2015, she has served as the Executive Committee Vice Chair of IEEE's Global Initiative on Ethical Considerations in the Design of AI and Autonomous Systems. She has also served on Lord Chief Justice’s advisory panel on AI and law, the advisory board for UNESCO's International Research Centre on AI, and AI4ALL's advisory board.

Selected awards and honors 

 2017 – Most Important 25 Women in Robotics
 2018 – 12 Brilliant Women in AI Ethics
 2020 – VentureBeat Women in AI Awards Responsibility & Ethics of AI Nominee
 2020 – 100 Brilliant Women in AI Ethics Hall of Fame Honoree
 2020 – Forbes Women Defining The 21st Century AI Movement
 2021 – The New York Times 10 Women Changing the Landscape of Leadership

References 

Living people
English barristers
Artificial intelligence ethicists
Alumni of the University of Sussex
St. Mary's University School of Law alumni
Year of birth missing (living people)